The 2000–01 Omani League was the 25th edition of the top football league in Oman. Al-Oruba SC were the defending champions, having won the previous 1999–00 Omani League season. Dhofar S.C.S.C. emerged as the champions of the 2000–01 Omani League with a total of 41 points.

Teams
This season the league had 10 teams. Sohar SC and Fanja SC were relegated to the Second Division League after finishing in the relegation zone in the 1999-00 season. The two relegated teams were replaced Second Division League teams Oman Club and Al-Ahli Club.

Stadia and locations

League table

Top level Omani football league seasons
1
Oman